Rubén Gracia Calmache (born 3 August 1981), known as Cani, is a Spanish former professional footballer. Usually a right midfielder, he also played on the left.

During his career, he played almost exclusively with Zaragoza and Villarreal, winning two major titles with the former club and appearing in 327 competitive matches with the latter.

Club career

Zaragoza
Cani was born in Zaragoza. A youth graduate of his hometown's Real Zaragoza, he was shining in the B team who were playing in the Segunda División B after a loan stint with lowly Utebo FC of Tercera División and, as the main squad's fate was already decided in the 2001–02 season (relegation, ranking last) he received his first-team debut, playing 30 minutes in a 1–1 home draw against FC Barcelona.

After helping the Aragonese club regain its top-flight status by appearing in 24 games and scoring five goals, his first coming on 23 March 2003 in a 2–0 win at Real Oviedo, Cani went on to become a vital midfield element. In the 2003–04 campaign, he helped Zaragoza win the Copa del Rey in a 3–2 extra time win over Real Madrid – he was also sent off during the match.

Villarreal
During 2005–06, Cani was one of La Liga's best passers, and at the season's end he signed with Villarreal CF for €11 million. He played 32 matches for the 2007–08 runners-up, but did not score.

In the 2008–09 campaign, after a shaky start, which included not being called to some matches by coach Manuel Pellegrini in spite of being healthy, Cani finished strongly, scoring five times in the last nine appearances, including the final three: Real Madrid (3–2), Valencia CF (3–1) and RCD Mallorca (3–2), as Villarreal finished fifth; after the Chilean manager's departure to Real Madrid, he again appeared in the starting XI regularly.

Cani continued to be an undisputed starter in 2010–11 – Robert Pires had also left the club. On 9 January 2011, he netted the opener at Real Madrid, with a subtle finish inside the box; already on the bench, he threw a water bottle at opposing manager José Mourinho after the coach celebrated Cristiano Ronaldo's hat-trick (which put the score at 3–2 for the hosts, eventually 4–2) in front of his team's bench, being immediately sent off. The one-match suspension was later lifted, and he found the net in the next game, a 3–3 home draw against Sevilla FC in the quarter-finals of the domestic cup, and in the following, scoring from more than 50 metres in a 4–2 home defeat of CA Osasuna, with the Valencians eventually finishing the league in fourth place; he added three goals in a semi-final run in the UEFA Europa League, including one in each leg of the last-four clash against FC Porto in an eventual 7–4 aggregate loss.

On 7 January 2015, Cani joined Atlético Madrid on loan for the remainder of the season, after successfully passing a medical. He made his first appearance three weeks later, coming on as a substitute for Arda Turan for the last 27 minutes of a 3–2 home loss to Barcelona in the Spanish Cup quarter-finals (4–2 loss on aggregate).

Later career
On 23 July 2015, Cani terminated his contract with Villarreal and signed a one-year deal with Deportivo de La Coruña the following day. He left at the end of the campaign, contributing 888 minutes to a 15th-place finish.

Cani returned to his first club Zaragoza on 6 July 2016, after agreeing to a two-year deal. Roughly one year later, despite featuring regularly during the second division season, the 36-year-old announced his retirement.

International career
In the run up to the 2006 FIFA World Cup, Spain national team manager Luis Aragonés called up Cani to a senior team get-together, however he was ultimately not part of the squad at the finals and never won a cap.

Personal life
Cani's nickname was passed down from his father and grandfather who were both footballers, as was his brother. His father Jesús held the record for most appearances for Andorra CF.

Career statistics

Honours
Zaragoza
Copa del Rey: 2003–04; Runner-up 2005–06
Supercopa de España: 2004

References

External links

1981 births
Living people
Spanish footballers
Footballers from Zaragoza
Association football midfielders
La Liga players
Segunda División players
Segunda División B players
Tercera División players
Real Zaragoza B players
Real Zaragoza players
Villarreal CF players
Atlético Madrid footballers
Deportivo de La Coruña players